William Thomson (1777–1833) was an American silversmith active in New York City. He had shops at 399 Broadway and William Street, and was commissioned by the City to make a silver service for Captain Samuel Chester Reid for gallant bravery at the Battle of Fayal. His work is collected in the Metropolitan Museum of Art, Museum of the City of New York, and Winterthur Museum.

References 
 American Silversmiths and Their Marks, Volume 3, Stephen Guernsey Cook Ensko, Robert Ensko, Incorporated, 1948, page 129.
 American silver at Winterthur, Ian M. G. Quimby, Dianne Johnson, Henry Francis du Pont Winterthur Museum, 1995, page 298.
 Art and the Empire City: New York, 1825-1861, Kevin J. Avery, Metropolitan Museum of Art (New York, N.Y.), Carrie Rebora Barratt, Dell Upton, Elliot Bostwick Davis, Morrison H. Heckscher, Thayer Tolles, Amelia Peck, Jeff L. Rosenheim, Caroline Rennolds Milbank, Alice Cooney Frelinghuysen, Deborah Dependahl Waters, page 369.
 The New York City Directory ..., Volume 2, C.R. Rode, late Doggett & Rode., 1843, page 335.

American silversmiths
1777 births
1833 deaths
Artists from New York City